Stefan Uroš III, known as Stefan Dečanski (– 11 November 1331), was the King of Serbia from 6 January 1322 to 8 September 1331. Dečanski was the son of King Stefan Milutin (d. 1321). He defeated two other pretenders to the Serbian throne. Stefan is known as Dečanski after the great Monastery of Visoki Dečani he built.

Early life
Stefan Uroš III was the son of King Stefan Uroš II Milutin and his first wife Jelena, a Serbian noblewoman. He was born before his father took the throne in 1282. While still a youth, he was sent by his father as a hostage with his entourage to Nogai Khan of the Golden Horde, to maintain the peace between the Serbs and Tatars. He stayed at Nogai's court until the Khan's death in 1299. By 1309, king Milutin appointed his son Stefan (future Dečanski) as governor of Zeta, where he remained until 1314.

Exile and return
In 1314, Dečanski quarreled with his father, who sent him to Constantinople to be blinded. Dečanski was never totally blinded and was likely not blinded at all. In Constantinople, Dečanski was at the court of Andronikos II Palaiologos, indicating good relations between the states. Dečanski wrote a letter to Danilo, Bishop of Hum, asking him to intervene with his father. Danilo wrote to Archbishop Nicodemus of Serbia, who spoke with Milutin and persuaded him to recall his son. In 1320, Dečanski was permitted to return to Serbia and was given the appanage of Budimlje, while his half-brother Stefan Konstantin, held Zeta.

Reign

Milutin became ill and died on 29 October 1321, leaving no formal instruction regarding his inheritance. Konstantin was crowned King in Zeta, but civil war broke out immediately as both Dečanski and his cousin, Stefan Vladislav II, claimed the throne. Dečanski revealed that his eyesight was still intact, claiming a miracle, and the populace rallied behind him believing the restoration of his sight to be a sign from God. On 6 January 1322, the archbishop of Serbia, Nicodemus, crowned Dečanski king and his son, Stefan Dušan, the young king. Dečanski later granted Zeta to Dušan as a fief, indicating his intention for Dušan to be his heir. According to one account, Dečanski offered to split the realm with Konstantin, who refused. Dečanski then invaded Zeta, and Konstantin was defeated and killed.

In the meantime, Vladislav II had been released from prison upon Milutin's death and recovered the throne of Syrmia, which his father had established in northern Serbia. Vladislav also claimed the throne of Serbia upon Milutin's death and mobilized local support from Rudnik, a former possession of Vladislav's father. Also supported by Hungarians, Bulgarians, and Bosnians, Vladislav consolidated control over Syrmia and prepared for battle with Dečanski.

In 1323, war broke out between Dečanski and Vladislav. In autumn, Vladislav still held Rudnik, but by the end of 1323, the market of Rudnik was held by officials of Dečanski, and Vladislav seems to have fled further north. Some of Vladislav's supporters from Rudnik, led by Ragusan merchant Menčet, took refuge in the nearby Ostrovica fortress, where they resisted Dečanski's troops. Dečanski sent envoys to Dubrovnik (Ragusa), to protest the support of Vladislav. Dubrovnik rejected Dečanski's complaint, claiming Ostrovica was held by Serbs. Dečanski was not satisfied, and in 1324 he rounded up all the Ragusan merchants he could find, confiscated their property, and held them captive. By year's end, Rudnik was restored to Dečanski, who released the merchants and returned their property. Vladislav was defeated in battle in late 1324, and fled to Hungary, that was holding Belgrade since 1319. Tensions between Dubrovnik and Serbia continued: in August 1325 Vojvoda Vojin plundered Dubrovnik, resulting in a brief trade ban. On 25 March 1326 Dečanski reaffirmed privileges previously granted to Ragusa by Milutin. Tensions began again, however, when Bosnia and Dubrovnik took actions against the Branivojevići.

Dečanski generally maintained an alliance with Andronikos II, aside from occasional disruptions. He avoided taking a position in the Byzantine civil war between Andronikos II and Andronikos III Palaiologos. Nevertheless, as Andronikos III gained control, he developed an alliance with Tsar Michael Asen III of Bulgaria. Michael Asen III divorced Dečanski's sister Anna and married the Byzantine princess Theodora Palaiologina instead. The allies intended to join forces for a major invasion of Serbia in 1330. In the most significant event of Dečanski's reign, he defeated and killed Michael Asen III in the Battle of Velbazhd (1330). Prince Stefan Dušan also contributed to the victory.

Hearing of Michael's defeat, Andronikos III retreated. Dečanski's subsequent conquests pushed the Serbian border south into Byzantine Macedonia. Some of his courtiers, however, were discontented with his policies and conspired to dethrone him in favour of Stefan Dušan. In 1331, Dušan came from Skadar to Nerodimlje to overthrow Dečanski, who fled to Petrič. On 21 August 1331 Dušan captured Petrič after a siege and imprisoned his father in Zvečan Fortress, where he died on 11 November 1331.

Family

With his first wife, whose name is not known, Dečanski had no issue.

By his second wife, Theodora of Bulgaria, Stefan Dečanski had:
 Stefan Uroš IV Dušan, who overthrew him and took royal title, and
 Dušica (or Dušman), who died before 1318.

By his third wife, Maria Palaiologina, daughter of John Palaiologos, Dečanski had:
 Simeon, later tried to usurp imperial title from his nephew, and ruled as independent ruler in Thessaly,
 Jelena, who married Mladen III Šubić, and
 Teodora, who married Dejan.

Legacy
Dečanski is seen as a noble character in epic poetry, and the Serbian Orthodox Church had him canonized. his feast day is 11 November (old style), thus being 24 November (new style). His remains are venerated at the church of the Visoki Dečani monastery, which he built, in the region of Metohija.

See also
 Nemanjić family tree
 History of Serbia

References

Sources

External links 

 

1331 deaths
14th-century Serbian monarchs
14th-century Christian saints
14th-century rulers in Europe
Serbian saints of the Eastern Orthodox Church
Burials at St. Michael's Cathedral (Belgrade)
People executed by ligature strangulation
Serbian exiles
Year of birth unknown
Blind royalty and nobility
Patricides
People of the Kingdom of Serbia (medieval)
Nemanjić dynasty
Ktetors
Founders of Christian monasteries
Burials at Visoki Dečani
Eastern Orthodox royal saints
Christian monarchs
1276 births